Gregory Burgess is an Australian architect based in Melbourne, Victoria. Burgess is especially notable for his buildings for Indigenous communities in Australia, and for his participatory design approach which has produced some remarkable and unique buildings.

He graduated from the Faculty of Architecture, Building and Planning at the University of Melbourne in 1970. He has led a practice called the Gregory Burgess Architects for 32 years.

Gregory Burgess received the RAIA Gold Medal in 2004, the Australian architecture profession's highest accolade. He has received over 40 professional and community awards including the AIA Sir Zelman Cowen Award and Victorian Architecture Medal.

His work has been exhibited at major galleries in London, Amsterdam, Tokyo, Edinburgh and all Australian cities. Eminent international journal Architectural Review claimed that:

Notable projects
Eltham Library
Catholic Theological College
Brambuk Aboriginal Cultural Centre
Box Hill Community Arts Centre
Uluru-Kata Tjuta Aboriginal Cultural Centre
Horsham Church of Michael
St John, Woolamai Surf Club
Twelve Apostles Visitor Centre
Sidney Myer Music Bowl Refurbishment

References

External links 
 Gregory Burgess architects website
 Gregory Burgess Architects on Aardvark listings

Architects from Melbourne
Living people
Year of birth missing (living people)
Recipients of the Royal Australian Institute of Architects’ Gold Medal
Architecture firms based in Victoria (Australia)
University of Melbourne alumni